The Cassidy Farmhouse is located in Barneveld, Wisconsin.

History
Henry and Sarah Cassidy were among the earliest settlers of Barneveld. The house was listed on the National Register of Historic Places in 1986 and on the State Register of Historic Places in 1989.

References

Houses on the National Register of Historic Places in Wisconsin
National Register of Historic Places in Iowa County, Wisconsin
Farmhouses in the United States
Houses in Iowa County, Wisconsin
Greek Revival architecture in Wisconsin
Limestone buildings in the United States
Houses completed in 1860